John Stocker Coffin Knowlton (December 11, 1798 – June 11, 1871) was an American newspaper editor, publisher and politician who served in both branches of the Massachusetts legislature, as the Mayor of Worcester, Massachusetts, and as the Sheriff of Worcester County, Massachusetts.

Biography
Knowlton was born in Hopkinton, New Hampshire to Daniel Knowlton and Mary Stocker. Knowlton attended Hopkinton and Phillips Andover academies, and graduated from Dartmouth College in 1823.

Knowlton married Anna W. Hartwell, of Littleton, Massachusetts on September 17, 1829. He died in Worcester on June 11, 1871.

Positions held
School teacher, Beverly, Massachusetts
Editor of the Lowell Journal, Lowell, Massachusetts
Editor and publisher of the Palladium, Worcester, Massachusetts from 1830 to 1871
Elector, United States Electoral College in 1856 United States presidential election
Massachusetts State Senator from 1852  to 1853
Mayor of the city of Worcester, Massachusetts from January 3, 1853 to January 1, 1855
High Sheriff of Worcester County from 1857 to 1871.

Notes

1798 births
1871 deaths
Phillips Academy alumni
Dartmouth College alumni
19th-century American newspaper editors
American newspaper publishers (people)
Democratic Party members of the Massachusetts House of Representatives
Democratic Party Massachusetts state senators
Mayors of Worcester, Massachusetts
Sheriffs of Worcester County, Massachusetts
People from Hopkinton, New Hampshire
19th-century American politicians
19th-century American businesspeople